Anastassia N. Alexandrova is an American chemist who is a professor at the University of California, Los Angeles. Her research considers the computational design of functional materials.

Early life and education 
Alexandrova was the Winner of the Russian Regional Student Olympiad in Chemistry in 2000. She attended the Saratov State University for her undergraduate studies, where she was awarded a scholarship from the Government of Russia for outstanding performance in science. She moved to the United States for her graduate studies at Utah State University, where she studied aromatic clusters using Ab initio genetic algorithms. In particular, she developed the Gradient Embedded genetic Algorithm (GEGA) to identify the minima of atomic clusters. After earning her doctorate, Alexandrova moved to Yale University, where she joined the laboratory of William L. Jorgensen. She also worked in the laboratory of John C. Tully where she studied the photochemistry of DNA fragments.

Research and career 
Alexandrova was appointed to the faculty at the University of California, Los Angeles in 2010. She develops multi-scale modeling methods to better understand novel functional materials. The materials considered by Alexandrova included quantum dots, artificial metalloenzymes, heterogeneous catalysis and ultra hard alloys. She makes use of various computational models, including density functional theory, molecular dynamics and ab initio quantum chemistry methods. Alexandrova spent 2016 as a Fulbright Program scholar at the École Normal Supérieure where she focused on computational catalysis.

Awards and honors 
 2014 National Science Foundation CAREER Award
 2015 American Chemical Society Rising Star Award
 2016 Fulbright Fellow at the École normale supérieure
 2018 University of California, Los Angeles Undergraduate Research Week Faculty Mentor Awards
 2019 University of California, Los Angeles Distinguished Teaching Award for Senate Faculty
 2020 American Chemical Society Physical Chemistry Division Early Career Award in Theoretical Chemistry 
 2021 Max Planck-Humboldt medal, for scientists with outstanding potential outside Germany.

Selected publications

References 

Living people
Year of birth missing (living people)
American people of Russian descent
University of California, Los Angeles faculty
Saratov State University alumni
Utah State University alumni
21st-century American chemists